Stuart John “Woody” Wood (born 25 February 1957), is a Scottish musician, songwriter and producer.

Career 
Wood is best known as the guitarist for the 1970s band the Bay City Rollers since joining in 1974.

During the 1970s, the Bay City Rollers would garner immense popularity, which would be nicknamed Rollermania (the name inspired by that of Beatlemania.

Bay City Rollers original members, Derek Longmuir, Alan Longmuir, Les McKeown and Eric Faulkner, have all left the band at certain points from the early 1980s to 2016, leaving Wood as the only member from the classic era still touring as the Bay City Rollers. 

He remains active with his new generation Bay City Rollers and also behind the scenes in the music industry, producing music through The Music Kitchen.

Personal Life 
In December 2019 Wood rescued Kruger, a 10-year-old black Labrador, which had gone missing in North Berwick, East Lothian.

Discography 

Studio albums

 Rollin' (1974)
 Once Upon a Star (1975)
 Bay City Rollers (1975)
 Wouldn't You Like It? (1975)
 Rock n' Roll Love Letter (1976)
 Dedication (1976)
 It's a Game (1977)
 Strangers in the Wind (1978)
 Elevator (1979)
 Voxx (1980)
 Ricochet (1981)
 Breakout '85 (1985)
 A Christmas Shang-A-Lang (2015)

References

External links
 Themusickitchen.co.uk

1957 births
Living people
Musicians from Edinburgh
Scottish male guitarists
Male bass guitarists
Scottish songwriters
Scottish keyboardists
Scottish bass guitarists
Scottish multi-instrumentalists
Scottish record producers
Bay City Rollers members
Scottish pop guitarists